Dallas Mark Hickman (born February 16, 1952) is a former American football defensive end in the National Football League for the Washington Redskins and the Baltimore Colts.  He played college football at the University of California and was drafted in the ninth round of the 1975 NFL Draft.

USFL

Washington Federals
On October 22, 1982, the Oakland Invaders traded the rights to Hickman to the Washington Federals.  He signed with the Federals on January 28, 1983, but then was released on February 27, 1983.

Birmingham Stallions
On February 28, 1983, he was awarded on waivers to the Birmingham Stallions and would play in 18 games during their 1983 season. The Stallions traded him to the Arizona Wranglers in exchange for guard Rick Kehr on March 7, 1984.

Arizona Wranglers
Hickman played in 14 games for the 1984 Wranglers.

References

1952 births
Living people
People from Martinez, California
Sportspeople from the San Francisco Bay Area
American football defensive ends
California Golden Bears football players
Washington Redskins players
Baltimore Colts players
Birmingham Stallions players
Arizona Wranglers players
Players of American football from California